Misfit 2 is a 2019 Dutch family film and is a sequel to the 2017 film Misfit. The film earned $1.5 million upon its initial release, making it the seventh most visited Dutch film of 2017. It won a Golden Film. The sequel Misfit 3: De Finale was released in 2020.

References

External links 
 

2019 films
Dutch children's films
2010s Dutch-language films
Dutch sequel films